White River at Sharon is a 1937 watercolor painting by the American Realist artist Edward Hopper. It was painted in September 1937 while Hopper and his wife were visiting friends on their farm in Sharon, Vermont.

References

Paintings by Edward Hopper
Paintings in the collection of the Smithsonian American Art Museum